Mir Ali Asghar Akbarzada also Akbarzola is an Afghan football manager.

Career
Since September 2002 until January 2003 he led the Afghanistan national football team. Since March until April 2003 he again coached the national team.
 
Also he was a head coach of the youth national team.

References

Year of birth missing (living people)
Living people
Afghan football managers
Afghanistan national football team managers
Place of birth missing (living people)